Miroslav Machovič (born March 21, 1976) is a Slovak former swimmer, who specialized in backstroke events. He is a two-time Olympian (1996 and 2000), and a former Slovak record holder in 50, 100, and (200 m backstroke-till today). During his sporting career, Machovic also trained for STU Trnava and Dukla Banska Bystrica under his coaches Ladislav Hlavatý, Jiřī Walter .

Machovic's Olympic debut came at the 1996 Summer Olympics in Atlanta. There, he failed to reach the top 16 final in any of his individual events, finishing thirty-third in the  100 m backstroke (57.78), and nineteenth in the 200 m backstroke (2:04.15).

At the 2000 Summer Olympics in Sydney, Machovic competed again in a backstroke double. He posted FINA B-standards of 56.63 (100 m backstroke) and 2:01.72 (200 m backstroke) from the European Championships in Helsinki, Finland. On the second day of the Games, Machovic placed twenty-eighth in the 100 m backstroke. Swimming in heat four, he shared a fourth seed with Portugal's Nuno Laurentino in a matching time of 56.95. Three days later, in the 200 m backstroke, Machovic challenged seven other swimmers in heat three, including Austria's 18-year-old Markus Rogan, who later earned a silver in Athens four years later. He came up short in sixth place and thirty-first overall at 2:04.73, exactly three seconds off his Slovak record and entry time.

References

External links
NBC 2008 Olympics profile

1976 births
Living people
Slovak male swimmers
Olympic swimmers of Slovakia
Swimmers at the 1996 Summer Olympics
Swimmers at the 2000 Summer Olympics
Male backstroke swimmers
Sportspeople from Trnava